Cordry Sweetwater Lakes is a census-designated place (CDP) in Hamblen Township, Brown County, in the U.S. state of Indiana. The population was 1,128 at the 2010 census.  Sweetwater Lake is 260 acres in size.

History
Cordry Sweetwater Lakes had its start in the 1960s with the completion of the Cordry and Sweetwater dams. The dams impounded the Cordry and Sweetwater lakes, around which property developers built up the community.

Geography
Cordry Sweetwater Lakes is located in northeastern Brown County at  (39.296284, -85.949220). It consists of a residential community surrounding two reservoirs, Cordry Lake and Sweetwater Lake.

Demographics

References

External links
Cordry Sweetwater Lakes Lot Owners Association

Census-designated places in Brown County, Indiana
Census-designated places in Indiana